Adelisa Grabus (born 26 May 1996) is a Swedish football forward who plays for AIK in the Swedish Damallsvenskan.

Honours

Club 
KIF Örebro DFF
Runner-up
 Damallsvenskan: 2014

International 
Sweden U17
Runner-up
 UEFA Women's Under-17 Championship: 2013

External links 
 
 
 
 

1996 births
Living people
Swedish women's footballers
KIF Örebro DFF players
Växjö DFF players
AIK Fotboll (women) players
Damallsvenskan players
Women's association football forwards
Elitettan players